Neil John Majewski (born 27 May 1954 in Footscray, Victoria) is an Australian cricketer, who played for the Tasmanian Tigers. He was a right-handed batsman and right arm fast medium bowler who represented Tasmania in 1979.

See also
 List of Tasmanian representative cricketers

External links

1954 births
Living people
Australian cricketers
Tasmania cricketers
Cricketers from Melbourne
People from Footscray, Victoria